is a Japanese novelist from Fujisawa, Kanagawa.

Life and career 
Tono's father is Japanese musician and singer-songwriter Atsushi Sakurai. He graduated from Komayose Elementary School and Ohba Junior High School in Fujisawa, Kanagawa Prefectural Hakuyo High School, and the Faculty of Law at Keio University. He did not read a lot in school and was rather more into sports. For a short while he was in a high school band. He later moved to Tokyo.

In 2020, Tono won the Akutagawa Prize for his book . He also won the Bungei Prize in 2019 for his work .

References 

Living people
1991 births
People from Fujisawa, Kanagawa
Japanese male writers
Writers from Kanagawa Prefecture
Akutagawa Prize winners
20th-century Japanese people
21st-century Japanese people